Artificial Paradises  is a 2012 Brazilian drama film directed by Marcos Prado and starring Nathalia Dill, Luca Bianchi and Lívia de Bueno.

Plot
Erika (Nathalia Dill) is a successful DJ and friend of Lara (Livia de Bueno). During a festival where Erika was working, they met Nando (Luca Bianchi) and, together, they live an intense moment. However, soon after the trio split up. Years after Erika and Nando are reunited in Amsterdam, where they fall in love. But just Erika remembers the real motive why they moved away shortly after they met, years before.

Cast
Nathalia Dill as Érika
Luca Bianchi as Nando
Lívia de Bueno as Lara
Bernardo Melo Barreto as Patrick
César Cardadeiro as Lipe
Divana Brandão as Márcia
Emílio Orciollo Netto as Mouse
Roney Villela as Mark
Cadu Fávero as Anderson
Sacha Bali as Pierre

Production
The Artificial Paradises name was inspired by the title of the book of the same name by Baudelaire. "I read the book and thought the title fit perfectly in the film, although addressing another era, the mid-19th century, and the consumption of other drugs, wine, opium and hashish," admits Prado.

Filming took place between 18 October and 25 November in Praia do Paiva, in Recife, and also in Rio de Janeiro, in the traditional Arpoador beach. Some external scenes were filmed in Amsterdam.

Music
The original soundtrack of the film was produced by Rodrigo Coelho and Gustavo MM.

 Faxing Berlin - Deadmau5
 First_Brain - Kaki King
 Shaolin Satellite - Thievery Corporation
 Out Here. In There. - Sidsel Endresen & Bugge Wesseltoft
 Ahuvati - Kaki King
 Daydream - Ash Ra Tempel
 Quagga - Magenetrixx 
 No Rush - Frogacult
 Phase Shift - Magnetrixx
 Drumming Headquarters - mycel - Frogacult
 Nick Drake Pot Pourri - Mogwai 
 Skazi - XTC - Skazi
 Tohuwabohu - Magnetrixx

 Suppencaspa - Magnetrixx
 Lemmink - Magnetrixx
 Outhouse (Main Mix) - Nathan Fake 
 Ups & Downs - Perfect Stranger (artist) Re Edit - Eitan Reiter
 Second Brain - Kaki King
 Brazil - Deadmau5
 Burn Girl Prom Queen - Mogwai 
 No Rush - Frogacult
 Ponta Pé - Renato Cohen
 Coco - Pedra Branca
 Metamusica - Pedra Branca
 True Story - Flow & Zeo 
 I Use to Say - Flow & Zeo
 Paraísos Artificiais - Gui Boratto

References

External links
 
 

Brazilian drama films
Films about drugs
Lesbian-related films
Brazilian LGBT-related films
Films shot in Rio de Janeiro (city)
2012 films
2012 LGBT-related films
2010s Portuguese-language films